Dangerous is an Indian crime thriller miniseries for MX Player originally written by Vikram Bhatt and directed by Bhushan Patel. The series marks the web debut of Bipasha Basu alongside Karan Singh Grover. It is co-produced by Mika Singh and Vikram Bhatt. The series also stars Sonali Raut, Natasha Suri, Suyyash Rai and Nitin Arora in key roles. It is available for streaming on the OTT platform MX Player from 14 August 2020.

Premise 
Aditya Dhanraj is a business tycoon whose life changes when his wife Dia goes missing. The drama deepens as Neha Singh, Aditya's former flame, enters as the investigating officer on the case.

Synopsis 
The series revolves around the life of Aditya Dhanraj (Karan Singh Grover), a young entrepreneur, who discovers that his wife Dia Dhanraj (Sonali Raut) has gone missing. He sets out to find his wife with the help of the police, only to discover that his ex-girlfriend Neha Singh (Bipasha Basu) will be investigating his case.

Cast 
 Karan Singh Grover as Aditya Dhanraj
 Bipasha Basu as Neha Singh 
 Sonali Raut as Dia Dhanraj
 Suyyash Rai as Vishal Vashisht 
 Natasha Suri as Gauri
 Nitin Arora as Jaggu
 Puja Gupta

Episodes

Season 1

Production

Development 
The web series was announced in the last week of May 2018, to be directed by Bhushan Patel and starring Karan Singh Grover opposite Bipasha Basu. It was tentatively titled Aadat, written by Vikram Bhatt and produced by singer Mika Singh and Vikram Bhatt.

The series marks the web debut of actress Bipasha Basu and the second collaboration with her husband Karan Singh Grover after Alone (2015).

Filming 
Principal photography commenced in London with lead actors Karan Singh Grover and Bipasha Basu, who had been spotted shooting on 27 September 2018.

Soundtrack 

The music for Dangerous was composed by Mika Singh, with lyrics written by Kalim Sheikh, Hardik, Azeem Shirazi, Kunal and Pooja Saini. The first song, "Eyes Teri Katilana Hai", was released as a teaser on 10 August 2020.

Track list

Marketing and release

Promotion 
The official trailer of the web series was launched on 6 August 2020 by MX Player on YouTube.

Release 
Dangerous was scheduled for streaming on OTT Platform MX Player from 14 August 2020.

Reception 
Hindustan Times mentioned, "Dangerous truly delivers on all counts and is undoubtedly one of the best that MX Player has delivered this year. It has a great story line, a cracking cast and all the right amount of intrigue."

News18.com gave the series a rating of 1 star, saying that, "A bland and clichéd plot topped with forced sexual tension makes Karan Singh Grover and Bipasha Basu's Dangerous a rather tedious watch."

Nandini Ramnath of Scroll.in called the series "harmless."

Divya Ramnani of Spotboye.com stated that Dangerous's "fast-paced track ... will keep you on the edge of your seats with some spectacular performances and a streak of unprecedented twists and turns. With each episode, your curiosity to know the truth will only go a notch higher. Not to miss Karan and Bipasha's steamy romance that will [light] up your screens. There's also dance, music and suspense to keep you hooked."

References

External links 
 
 Dangerous on MX Player

2020 web series debuts
Indian drama web series
MX Player original programming